The U.S. House Committee on Transportation and Infrastructure is a standing committee of the United States House of Representatives.

History
The Committee on Transportation and Infrastructure was formerly known as the Committee on Public Works and Transportation from 1975 to 1994, and the Committee on Public Works between 1947 and 1974.

Under the Legislative Reorganization Act of 1946 the Committees on Public Buildings and Grounds (1837–1946), Rivers and Harbors (1883–1946), Roads (1913–46), and the Flood Control (1916–46) were combined to form the Committee on Public Works. Its jurisdiction from the beginning of the 80th Congress (1947–48) through the 90th Congress (1967–68) remained unchanged.

While these four original committees retained their separate identities, they were reduced to subcommittees. Additional subcommittees were formed for issues on Beach Erosion, 80th Congress (1947–48) and for Watershed Development, 86th–90th Congresses (1959–68). Special Subcommittees included those: to Investigate Questionable Trade Practices, 80th Congress; to Study Civil Works, 82nd Congress (1951–52); on the Federal-Aid Highway Program, 86th–90th Congresses; and on Economic Development Programs, 89th–90th Congresses (1965–68). Ad Hoc Committees were established on Montana Flood Damage, 88th Congress (1963–64); on Appalachian Regional Development, 88th–90th Congresses; and on the 1967 Alaska Exposition, 89th Congress.

Members, 118th Congress

Resolutions electing members:  (Chair),  (Ranking Member),  (D),  (R)

Subcommittees
There are six subcommittees:

Chairs

Historical membership rosters

117th Congress

Resolutions electing members:  (Chair),  (Ranking Member),  (D),  (R),  (D),  (D)

Subcommittees

116th Congress

Sources:  (Chair),  (Ranking Member),  (D),  (R),  (D),  (R)

Subcommittees

115th Congress

Sources:  (Chair),  (D),  (R)

114th Congress

112th Congress

 Resolutions electing Republican members
 Resolutions electing Democratic members

See also
 List of current United States House of Representatives committees

References

External links

 Committee website (Archive) 
 House Transportation and Infrastructure Committee. Legislation activity and reports, Congress.gov. 
 House Transportation and Infrastructure Committee Hearings and Meetings Video. Congress.gov.

House Committee on Transportation and Infrastructure
Transportation
1842 establishments in Washington, D.C.
Organizations established in 1842